Tarucus venosus, the Himalayan Pierrot or veined Pierrot, is a small butterfly found in India that belongs to the lycaenids or blues family. The species was first described by Frederic Moore in 1882.

See also
List of butterflies of India
List of butterflies of India (Lycaenidae)

References
 
  
 
 
 
 

Tarucus
Butterflies of Asia
Butterflies described in 1882